The following is a list of the heads of state of Nepal, from the unification of the country and the establishment of the Kingdom of Nepal in 1768 to the present day.

The King of Nepal was the country's head of state from the unification and the establishment of the kingdom in 1768 to 2008. Since 2008, the head of state has been the President of Nepal after the abolition of monarchy and the establishment of a republic.

Kingdom of Nepal (1768–2008)

Nepal was ruled by monarchs of the Shah dynasty from 1768 till the abolition of monarchy in 2008. However, from 1846 until the 1951 revolution, the country was de facto ruled by the hereditary prime ministers from the Rana dynasty, reducing the role of the Shah monarch to that of a figurehead. The monarchy was abolished on 28 May 2008 by the 1st Constituent Assembly.

Transitional period (State of Nepal, 2007–2008)
Under the interim constitution adopted in January 2007, all powers of governance were removed from the king, and the Constituent Assembly elected in 2008 was to decide in its first meeting whether to continue the monarchy or to declare a republic. During the suspension of the monarchy, Girija Prasad Koirala, then Prime Minister of Nepal, acted as the Head of State. On 28 May 2008, the Assembly voted to abolish the monarchy. Ram Baran Yadav was elected by the Constituent Assembly, and was sworn in as the nation's first president on 23 July 2008.

Status:

Federal Democratic Republic of Nepal (2008–present)

See also
History of Nepal
King of Nepal
President of Nepal

Notes

References

External links
List of Nepali heads of state and government
World Statesmen - Nepal

Nepal

heads of state